Atah Hu Adonai L'Vadecha ("You alone are the Lord") is a series of verses recited during Shacharit, the morning prayers of Judaism, in pesukei dezimra. It is composed of verses 5-11 in Chapter 9 of Nechemiah.

The recitation of these verses was introduced in the 13th century by Rabbi Meir of Rothenburg. The custom to recite these verses, along with Vayivarech David (from Chronicles) prior to the Song of the sea is to recall miracles brought on by God at the Red Sea.

In most siddurim, this prayer appears as two separate paragraphs. What is interesting about this division is not the mere division, but that the split occurs in the middle of the third verse (Nechemiah 9:8). This is signifying Abraham's change of name from Abram to Abraham, elevating his status from the father of Aram to the father of a multitude of nations. The division originates a custom that when there is a Berit Milah taking place in the community, the second part (through the end of Az Yashir) is recited responsively.

References

Pesukei dezimra
Siddur of Orthodox Judaism
Hebrew words and phrases in Jewish prayers and blessings